Mary-Pat Moore (born 24 April 1961) is an Irish former cricketer who played as a right-handed batter and right-arm medium bowler. She appeared in 37 One Day Internationals for Ireland between 1987 and 1996. She played domestic cricket for Yorkshire.

Moore captained Ireland between 1983 and 1993, including at the 1988 and 1993 World Cups. Her highest ODI score came in 1995, when she scored 114* against Denmark at the 1995 Women's European Cricket Cup.

References

External links
 
 

1961 births
Living people
Cricketers from Dublin (city)
Irish women cricketers
Ireland women One Day International cricketers
Irish women cricket captains
Yorkshire women cricketers